Bogenfels is a location in the coastal Namib Desert of Namibia, noted for its natural rock formations (hence the name, which means "arch rock" in German).

Geology 

Town 
A settlement developed in the area after diamonds were discovered. In 1950, it was evacuated and has remained a ghost town since. A narrow-gauge railway line once ran to Kolmanskop.

Philately 
From 1931 to 1996, South West Africa and later Namibia issued postage stamps depicting the Bogenfels.

References 

Natural arches
Coasts of Namibia
Rock formations of Namibia